Bery may refer to:

People
 John Bery
 Robert Bery
 Suman Bery, Indian economist

Other
 Ynys Bery, Wales
 Boston Elevated Railway

See also
 Beri (disambiguation)